Trainer is a surname. Notable people with the surname include:

 Bob Trainer (1927–1982), Australian rules footballer
 David Trainer, American television director
 David Trainer (1814-1890), American textile manufacturer
 Douglas Trainer, former president of the National Union of Students of the United Kingdom
 Harry Trainer (1872–?), Welsh international footballer
 Jack Trainer, a character in the 2022 action-adventure comedy film The Lost City
 James Trainer (1863–1915), Welsh association football player of the Victorian era
 Joe Trainer (born 1968), American football coach and former player
 John Trainer (born 1943), former Australian politician.
 Marie Trainer (born 1940s), former mayor of Haldimand County, Ontario, Canada
 Melissa Trainer (born 1978), American astrobiologist
 Stephen Trainer, Scottish professional association footballer
 Ted Trainer, an Australian academic, author, and an advocate
 Todd Trainer, drummer for the band Shellac

See also 
 Trainer (disambiguation)